Lynwood MacPherson (born September 21, 1947) is a Canadian politician, farmer and businessman. He represented 4th Queens in the Legislative Assembly of Prince Edward Island from 1986 to 1996 as a Liberal.

MacPherson was born in 1947 in Charlottetown, Prince Edward Island. A graduate of Montague Regional High School, he married Mary Patricia Evans in 1973. Prior to entering politics, MacPherson was a tobacco farmer, and a shareholder and plant manager for Belfast Tobacco Growers Limited.

MacPherson entered provincial politics in 1986, when he was elected a councillor for the electoral district of 4th Queens. He was re-elected in the 1989 and 1993 elections. On May 21, 1996, MacPherson was appointed to the Executive Council of Prince Edward Island as Minister of Provincial Affairs and Attorney General. In the 1996 election, MacPherson was defeated by former Progressive Conservative MLA Wilbur MacDonald in the new Belfast-Pownal Bay riding.

References

1947 births
Living people
Farmers from Prince Edward Island
Members of the Executive Council of Prince Edward Island
People from Charlottetown
Prince Edward Island Liberal Party MLAs